The Edmonton Expo Centre, formerly the Northlands AgriCom and also known as the Edmonton Exposition and Conference Centre is a multi-purpose convention centre in Edmonton, Alberta, Canada. Operated by Explore Edmonton on behalf of the City of Edmonton, it is located in Edmonton's Montrose neighbourhood, across the street from the (now closed) Northlands Coliseum.

History and use
The facility was built in 1984 on the site of the old Edmonton Gardens, the first home of the Edmonton Oilers. The Oilers moved across 118 Avenue in 1974 to the new Northlands Coliseum. Prior to 2009, the EXPO Centre was known as the Northlands AgriCom, or simply The Agricom, from the agricultural and commercial trade shows which it was built to host.

From 1996 to 1998, a portion of the venue was used as the home arena of the Edmonton Ice of the Western Hockey League. It was considered a substandard venue for the team, which was prevented from using the nearby Coliseum; Edmonton Sun writer Terry Jones described the arena as being an "abomination of a building", "with the atrocious situation of a reasonable $13.50 ticket price but a $10 Northlands parking price to go with it." The team would subsequently re-locate to Kootenay.

In 2002 the arena became host of the 2002 World Ringette Championships. 

The additions included four new exhibition halls, and new conference centre named the Alberta Ballroom. The Alberta government contributed $50 million to the project, while the federal government contributed $25 million. The city loaned $48 million.

In 2010, the Edmonton Expo Centre hosted the last Powerama Motoring Expo, which it had hosted since the expo's inception in 1984.

In February 2016, as part of the "Northlands Vision 2020" proposal, it was revealed that Northlands hoped to upgrade the existing arena to a more modern standard 5,000-seat indoor arena to the Expo Centre for concerts and sporting events. However, the 2016 opening of the new downtown arena Rogers Place, which replaced Northlands' Rexall Place as the home of Edmonton Oilers games and other major events, caused the organization to incur an increasing amount of debt due to lost event revenue.

In July 2017, it was reported that Northlands had been in private discussions with the city about its future. The organization intended to divest itself of Rexall Place, Northlands Park, and the Edmonton Expo Centre in order to focus on promoting agricultural innovation. On August 29, 2017, the city of Edmonton announced that it would take ownership of the Edmonton Expo Centre and forgive $42 million in debt. The venue's operations were merged with those of the downtown Shaw Conference Centre under the Edmonton Economic Development Corporation in 2018. The Northlands Coliseum was similarly taken over by the city on the same day, although it also ceased operations.

In June 2018, it was announced that the Edmonton Stingers of the newly established Canadian Elite Basketball League would play their home games at the Expo Centre.

Facilities

References

External links

Indoor arenas in Alberta
Sports venues in Edmonton
Western Hockey League arenas
Convention centres in Canada
Music venues in Edmonton
Event venues established in 1984
1984 establishments in Alberta